This Way Out is a 1916 American silent comedy film featuring Oliver Hardy.

Cast
 Bobby Burns - Pokes
 Walter Stull - Jabbs
 Oliver Hardy - Plump (as Babe Hardy)
 Billy Ruge - Runt
 Ethel Marie Burton
 Frank Hanson

See also
 List of American films of 1916
 Oliver Hardy filmography

References

External links

1916 films
American silent short films
American black-and-white films
1916 comedy films
1916 short films
Silent American comedy films
American comedy short films
1910s American films